Pål Fjelde (born 26 July 1994) is a Norwegian footballer who plays as a midfielder for Staal Jørpeland. Fjelde has previously played for Norwegian clubs Viking and Bryne, and had brief spells with Scottish Championship side St Mirren and Faroe Islands Premier League side 07 Vestur.

Career
Born in Jørpeland, Fjelde started his career in Staal Jørpeland IL. He made his league debut as a substitute against Stabæk in June 2014. On 20 November 2014 he signed for Norwegian First Division side Bryne.

On 12 January 2017, Fjelde transferred to Scottish Championship side St Mirren, signing with the club until the end of the 2016–17 season. Fjelde left the club at the end of his contract, having made seven appearances for the Buddies.

Later and coaching career
In January 2018, Fjelde returned to Bryne FK. Beside that, 24-year old Fjelde also coached the clubs U16s. Furthermore, he also coached in the talent project Jæder Talent, and worked at the club's football leisure scheme.

In January 2020, Fjelde returned to his former childhood club Staal Jørpeland IL. He was also hired to coach Viking FK's 16-2 team.

On 28 June 2020, Fjelde was also hired player-manager for Staal Jørpeland IL together with Vegard Oftedal on interim basis. The duo was replaced on 3 August 2020. However, he continued as a player for the club and also in his coaching position at Viking.

References

External links

1994 births
Living people
People from Strand, Norway
Norwegian footballers
Viking FK players
Bryne FK players
St Mirren F.C. players
07 Vestur players
Staal Jørpeland IL players
Eliteserien players
Norwegian First Division players
Norwegian Second Division players
Norwegian Third Division players
Norwegian Fourth Division players
Scottish Professional Football League players
Faroe Islands Premier League players
Association football defenders
Norwegian expatriate footballers
Expatriate footballers in Scotland
Norwegian expatriate sportspeople in Scotland
Expatriate footballers in the Faroe Islands
Norwegian expatriate sportspeople in the Faroe Islands
Viking FK non-playing staff
Sportspeople from Rogaland